The Spader EP is the third official release and first EP by progressive metal band, No More Pain. It was recorded, mixed and mastered at HomeBrewed Recording in New Brunswick, New Jersey. It is a concept album centered around Mr. Spader, who was a contributor for the band's Indiegogo campaign to raise funds for their previous album The Post Human Condition. His reward was supposed to be a song written about him by the band, but it resulted in a half-hour long EP. The album contains many guests of the local music scene in New Jersey.

It was self-released on May 18, 2016.

Track listing

Personnel
 Mike Roman - vocals, guitar, keyboards
 Matt McDermott - keyboards
 John Moroney - bass
 Dan Rainone -  drums, percussion

Additional musicians
 Mike Rainone - additional vocals on "Spader's Dream"
 Cody McCorry - theremin and saw on "Spader's Dream"
 Matt Brown - whistles and whispers on "Spader's Dream"
 Patrick Antonello - additional vocals on "Spader?"
 "The Spader Choir" on "Spader?": No More Pain (band), Mike Rainone, Matt Brown, Patrick Antonello, Daimon Santa Maria, Jenn Santa Maria

Production
 Engineered, mixed and mastered by Nishit Nandankar at HomeBrewed Recording in North Brunswick, NJ
 Additional recording by Lou Morreale IV at Studio IV in Long Branch, NJ
 Cover artwork by Gregg Bautista
 Design and layout by Dan Rainone

References

2016 EPs
Concept albums
No More Pain (band) albums